Maglione is a comune (municipality) in the Metropolitan City of Turin in the Italian region Piedmont, about  northeast of Turin.

Maglione borders the following municipalities: Borgo d'Ale, Borgomasino, and Moncrivello.

Population history

References

Cities and towns in Piedmont
Canavese